Kseniia Zastavska, born Oksana Volodymyrivna Prysiazhniuk in Odesa, Ukraine, is a Ukrainian poet, writer and screenwriter.

Education 
Zastavska is a graduate of the Odesa Institute of National Economy (currently Odesa National Economics University). After undertaking a course in journalism provided by the editorial board of Vechernyaya Odessa, she was taught script writing by the Odesa screenwriter Dmytro Kostromenko.

Career
Zastavska is a member of the cinematography coordination council at Odesa City Council and a member of the Barwy Kresowe Polish-Ukrainian arts partnership organization. She has also been described as among Odesa's national treasures.

Zastavaska started her creative activity by writing the lyrics of children's songs. In collaboration with the composer and vocalist Liliia Ostapenko, she created songs that have been performed by children's groups from Odesa, Kyiv and New York. She has also written the lyrics of songs for adult performers.

In 2015, Zastavska represented Ukraine at the Vilnius International book fair and had the honour of joining Valerii Zhovtenko, Ukraine's ambassador to Lithuania, in presenting Mascot of Love in Lithuanian to the President of Lithuania, Dalia Grybauskaitė. Zastavska used the occasion to thank the President for her support of Ukraine. In 2016, she returned to the fair to promote the Lithuanian translation of her novel Stek. Laces of Life.

She has translated and promoted the publication of a book by the notable Estonian writer, journalist and film director Imbi Paju, Hidden Memories. The presentation of the book was held May 24, 2019 in the Embassy of Estonia in Ukraine. The book was also represented in the international program of the Art Arsenal on May 25, 2019, in Kyiv.

In March 2022, the film Shchedryk was awarded the main prize for writing and directing at the Women's International Film Festival in Nigeria. On April 1, the film opened a charity marathon of Ukrainian films in Warsaw, and on April 10, it represented Ukrainian cinema in Toronto.

Bibliography 
Poetry:
 "Fantasies about Love" (2010)

Prose:
 "Galatea New Style" (2011)
 "Anna for Don Juan" (2012)
 "A Chanson for Two Voices" (2012)
 "Amber Saga" (2012)
 Mascot of Love" (2013)
 "Stek. Laces of Life" (2016)
 "Veto to Happiness" (2017)
 "Refraction" (2018)

Translations:
 "Mascot of Love" (Lithuanian language, 2015)
 "Stek. Laces of Life" (Lithuanian language, 2015)
 "Mascot of Love" (Hungarian language, 2017)
 Mascot of Love (Slovak language, 2018)

Screenplays:
 "Stef" (2022)
 "Shchedryk" (2021)
 "Diagnosis: Dissident" (2021)
 "Basel" (2021)
 "The Witch"

Awards and honors 
 for the script "Steph":
 winner New York International Film Awards in the nomination "Best War Script" and "Best Drama Script" (2022, USA)
 winner Best Script Award (London, United Kingdom) in the nomination "Best War Screenplay"
 winner Prague International Film Awards in the nomination "Best Drama Screenplay" (Czech Republic)
 winner Kosice International Film Festival in the nomination "Best Drama Screenplay" (Slovakia)
 finalist Los Angeles International Screenplay Awards Fall (2022, USA)
 quarter finalist Park City 2023
 honorable mention Changing Face International Film Festival (Australia)
 quarter finalist Big Apple Film Festival Screenplay Competition (USA)
 for the script "Actress":
 Gold Award WRPNSC (USA)
 honorary Diploma and statue “Odesa Treasure”

References

External links 
 

People from Odesa
Ukrainian women poets
Ukrainian women writers
Ukrainian screenwriters
Year of birth missing (living people)
Living people